The Hammond Packing Plant was a division of the G.H. Hammond Company, Limited located at South 36th and O Streets in South Omaha, Nebraska.

History 

The plant was opened in the 1880s and was then closed in 1901, when it was bought by the Armour Company for $5,000,000. In 1905 the National Packing Company bought the plant to reopen it. National was later busted by the federal government in the "Beef Trust" conspiracy. There were a number of riots and civil unrest that originated or included events at the Cudahy Packing Plant.

See also 
 History of Omaha, Nebraska
 Economy of Omaha, Nebraska

References

External links 
 "Historic photo of Hammond Packing Plant"

Former buildings and structures in Omaha, Nebraska
Meatpacking industry in Omaha, Nebraska
History of South Omaha, Nebraska
1901 disestablishments in Nebraska
1880s establishments in Nebraska